ISEA may refer to:
Icosahedral Snyder Equal Area, see geodesic grid
Independent Schools Education Association
Institute for Social and Economic Analyses
Inter-Society for the Electronic Arts (now ISEA International)
International Safety Equipment Association, formerly the Industrial Safety Equipment Association
International Society of Exposure Analysis (ISEA), now International Society of Exposure Science
ISEA (Int'l Space Exploration Agency), in the TV series Extant
International Sustainable Energy Assessment, see Energy and Environmental Security Initiative
Island South-East Asia or Maritime Southeast Asia

People
Rafael Isea (born 1968), Venezuelan politician

See also
 Institute of Southeast Asian Studies (ISEAS), see Singapore Think Tanks